{{Speciesbox
|image = Daphnadra apatela Martinsville.JPG
|image_caption = Daphnadra apatela at its southern limit of distribution, on an alluvial plain at private property, Martinsville (33° S), Australia
|status =
|status_system =
|genus = Daphnandra
|species = apatela
|authority = Schodde
|synonyms = {{smalldiv|
 Daphnandra micrantha (Tul.) Benth. sens. lat.
 Daphnandra species A
}}
}}Daphnandra apatela, the socketwood, light yellowwood or canary socketwood is a common rainforest tree in eastern Australia. It grows in the more fertile alluvial soils and basaltic soils. Distributed from the Watagan Mountains (31° S) in New South Wales to Miriam Vale (24° S) near Gladstone in Queensland.

 Naming & taxonomy 
A member of the ancient Gondwana family Atherospermataceae. Formerly considered Daphnandra micrantha, the Australian socketwood. Recently it has been recognised as a separate species, as published by Richard Schodde. The generic name Daphnandra refers to a similarity of the anthers of the Bay Laurel. Greek daphne refers to the Bay Laurel, and andros from the Greek for man. The species name apatela is from the Greek to deceive, because of the similarity to Daphnandra micrantha. A feature where larger branchlets meet the main trunk resembles a "ball and socket" type joint. Hence the common name of Socketwood''. Canary Socketwood or Light Yellowwood refers to the colour of the timber.

Description 
A medium to large tree, sometimes exceeding 30 metres tall with a trunk diameter of up to 75 cm. Horizontal branches give a dense crown. The base of the stem is sometimes flanged, but not buttressed. Bark is grey and somewhat rough, with raised corky bumps. The bark contains alkaloids which have a similar effect as strychnine, though milder. Small branches covered in downy hairs, flattened when joining to the main branches. Ball and socket type joint where larger branchlets join the main stem.

Leaves 
Leaves feature about 20 teeth on each side. The base of the leaf is not toothed. Leaves 3 to 8 cm long, 1.5 to 4 cm wide. The midrib is raised or flattened on the top surface, raised below. Leaf venation more evident below the leaf. 2 to 7 lateral veins from the midrib on each side. The green coloured leaf stem is 3 to 8 mm long. Leaves opposite on the stem.

Flowers and fruit 
Flowers from September to October, being white in small panicles. Flowers 8 mm in diameter on short stalks. The fruit is a capsule, covered in fine brown hair. Egg shaped, round or sometimes asymmetrical. 12–25 mm long. Fruit matures between December to February, or as late as May. Regeneration from fresh seeds yields a success rate of 10% after 24 days.

References

 Daphnandra apatela at PlantNET – NSW Flora Online access date 29 January 2010

Atherospermataceae
Trees of Australia
Flora of Queensland
Flora of New South Wales